Life Goes On is Lil Suzy's third studio album, released on April 4, 1995 by Metropolitan Recording Corporation. It was her first album to release several hit singles, namely "Promise Me", which was her most successful single on the Billboard Hot 100, peaking at #62 in February 1995. "Now & Forever", Just Can't Get Over You" and "When I Fall In Love" were the other three singles, but they weren't entered in any music chart. The album is also significant for Lil Suzy's change in style towards Eurodance.

Track listing

Chart positions
Singles - Billboard (North America)

References

Lil Suzy albums
1995 albums